Karayayla is a village in the Uzunköprü District of Edirne Province in Turkey.

References

Villages in Uzunköprü District